Thomas Henry Craig Stevenson CBE (1870 – 12 September 1932) was a Northern Irish statistician.

He was born in Strabane, County Tyrone, and educated at University College, London, before receiving his MB at the University of London. He set up in practice and read for an MD in State Medicine and was later offered a post in the Brighton Public Health Department. After posts in public health elsewhere, he became the School Medical Officer of Somerset County Council. In 1909, he was appointed Superintendent of Statistics in the General Register Office.

He was awarded the Guy Medal in Gold by the Royal Statistical Society in 1920 and the Edward Jenner Medal of the Royal Society of Medicine. He was appointed a CBE in 1919.

References 

1870 births
1932 deaths
People from Strabane
Alumni of University College London
Alumni of the University of London
Commanders of the Order of the British Empire
Irish statisticians
Presidents of the Royal Statistical Society
Civil servants in the General Register Office